Eugene Philip Amano (born March 1, 1982) is a former American football offensive lineman. Playing for the Tennessee Titans from 2004 to 2013 as both a center and guard, he replaced eight-time All-Pro selection Kevin Mawae as starting center in 2010. Amano is one of three NFL players to be born in the Philippines, along with Tim Tebow and Fred Jones.

High school career
He attended Rancho Bernardo High School in San Diego, California, where he was an all-conference performer as an offensive and defensive lineman during his senior season and also lettered in basketball and track.

Late into his senior year, Amano had no scholarship offers and planned to walk-on to either the University of New Mexico or San Diego State University. But when SE Missouri State called one of his high school coaches about players on his team, he sold the recruiters on Amano. The recruiters acquired a tape of Amano and immediately offered him a scholarship.

College career
He attended Southeast Missouri State University. As a senior, he won the Division I-AA Dave Rimington Trophy, given annually to top center in college football at each level of competition. Amano was also named first-team All-American by the American Football Coaches Association, The NFL Draft Report and Football Gazette.

Professional career

2004 NFL Draft
Projected to go undrafted by Sports Illustrated, who labeled him as "a solid practice-squad prospect," Amano was ranked as the No. 20 center available in the 2004 NFL Draft. He was eventually selected in the seventh round, 239th overall, by the Titans. He was the seventh of nine centers selected in this draft, and also the first offensive lineman selected from Southeast Missouri State since Dan Peiffer in 1973.

Tennessee Titans
For his first four NFL seasons, Amano served primarily as a reserve at both center and guard. In 2008, he replaced left guard Jacob Bell in the starting lineup, and went on to start 31 games at that position.  In 2009, Amano was a member of an offensive line that blocked for the NFL's second-best rushing attack (162.0 yards per game) allowed just 16 sacks, the second fewest in the NFL.

On February 17, 2010, he signed a five-year, $26.25 million contract with $10.5 million guaranteed. Amano was moved to center to replace a retiring Kevin Mawae.

Amano was released by the Titans in 2013 after missing the entire 2012 season due to a torn triceps injury.

Post-Career
After retiring from football, Eugene Amano and his brother Fred Amano purchased four existing L&L Hawaiian Barbecue franchises in their home town of San Diego and have since opened more franchises for the restaurant chain including one in Cool Springs, Tennessee, near Nashville.

Personal
Amano is married to Frances Santos. The couple splits time between Nashville, Tennessee, and San Diego, California. Amano developed The Amano Family Foundation to benefit inner-city youth of National City, California.

References

External links
Official Website
Tennessee Titans bio

1982 births
Living people
American football centers
American sportspeople of Filipino descent
Filipino emigrants to the United States
People from Manila
Players of American football from San Diego
Southeast Missouri State Redhawks football players
Tennessee Titans players
Rancho Bernardo High School alumni